Park Dome Kumamoto is a multi-purpose indoor arena in Kumamoto, Kumamoto, Japan. The capacity of the arena is 2,000 and was opened in 1997. Games were played here during the 1997 World Men's Handball Championship.

See also 
KKWing Stadium

External links 

Indoor arenas in Japan
Handball venues in Japan
Buildings and structures in Kumamoto
Sports venues in Kumamoto Prefecture
1997 establishments in Japan
Sports venues completed in 1997